South Bend International Airport  
is a commercial and freight airport located three miles northwest of downtown South Bend, in St. Joseph County, Indiana, United States. It is the state's second busiest airport in terms of passenger traffic after Indianapolis International Airport.

The National Plan of Integrated Airport Systems for 2015–2019 called it a primary commercial service facility.

Federal Aviation Administration and St. Joseph County Airport Authority records show the airport had 337,140 passenger enplanements in 2020 with an estimated total air passenger volume of over 680,000. It is owned by the St. Joseph County Airport Authority. Passengers can make connections to local public transportation services such as the  South Shore Line trains to Millennium Station in Chicago and the local TRANSPO bus route #4 which travels along Lincoln Way.

History
In the early days, South Bend's main airport was Cadet Field in present-day Granger. Vincent Hugo Bendix, founder of Bendix Aviation, bought land northwest of South Bend in 1929 to provide air service closer to the city. Bendix Municipal Airport opened in 1933.

Bendix Airport was later called St. Joseph County Airport, then Michiana Regional Transportation Center. The airport was renamed South Bend Regional Airport on January 1, 2000, to help identify the airport, many travelers not knowing the meaning of Michiana (taken from "Michigan" and "Indiana").

The April 1957 OAG shows 10 weekday departures on North Central, 9 on United, 6 on Lake Central and 3 on TWA. North Central Airlines merged with Southern Airways on July 1, 1979, commencing operations with Republic from South Bend.

Until the 1980s the airport had four runways; in the 1950s runway 9 was 5000 ft, runways 6 (now taxiway A-3) and 12 (now taxiway A-4) were 4000 ft and the 3059-ft runway 18 connected the west ends of runways 6 and 12. In 1963-65 runway 9 was extended to 6000 ft. In January 1967 SBN got its first scheduled jets, United Caravelles flying Chicago O'Hare-South Bend-Fort Wayne-Newark and back.

On April 23, 2014, the St. Joseph County Airport Authority announced the airport was changing its name from South Bend Regional Airport to South Bend International Airport. The Airport Authority has had conversations with two airlines interested in providing service to Mexico and the Bahamas and indicated that it was looking at service to Toronto, Ireland and Europe. As part of the change, the airport will begin a $3 million (USD) project to construct a general aviation facility and a border customs area, to be financed through federal, state and airport funds.

Administration
The airport is governed by the St. Joseph County Airport Authority, which is a municipality in the State of Indiana. Its four bipartisan board members are appointed by the St. Joseph County Commissioners. The Airport Authority is directed by Mike Daigle who is an accredited airport executive. Board members include Thomas S. Botkin, Abraham Marcus, David R. Sage and James V. Wyllie. The Airport Authority employs approximately 60 staff members.

The mission of the St. Joseph County Airport Authority as defined is "to maximize the safety, service, efficiency and effectiveness of South Bend Airport for the traveling public, and to promote the value of the airport to the community."

Facilities

The terminal, built in 1981 and designed by HOK and Cole Associates 
and expanded in 2011 by Ken Herceg & Associates, has one nine-gate concourse. Seven of the nine gates (2, 3, 5, 6, 7, 8, 9) have jetways, while two gates (2A and 6A) are ground level. Amenities include cafes and restaurants, pet relief area, a concession area/lounge, a gift shop, a children's play area, a business center, and free Wi-Fi available throughout the terminal.

Despite being partially obstructed by the new concourse the in-terminal viewing area remains open and offers live air traffic control transmissions from South Bend Air Traffic Control Tower/TRACON as well as a small airport-focused museum. The viewing area is located on the second level of the terminal's atrium adjacent to US Customs.

The airport is one of the few multi-modal transportation facilities in America that provide air, interstate bus and interstate rail service at one terminal. The St. Joseph County Airport Authority claims the airport was the first truly multi-modal airport in the country. As of 2019, interstate bus services have been moved to the downtown South Bend bus station.

June 2017 brought the grand opening of SBN's International General Aviation Facility (GAF) which cleared nearly 60 international aircraft in its first partial year of operation. On July 16, 2019, a Boeing 747 chartered by the Liverpool Soccer Club landed at South Bend from Manchester, England. This flight marked the opening of the Federal Inspection Station (FIS). On the same day, US Customs and Border Patrol announced South Bend Airport would be the state's first Global Entry Enrollment Center.

The airport is a maintenance base for regional carrier SkyWest Airlines.

Operations
Within Indiana, the airport is second in passenger enplanements (417,929) after Indianapolis International (4,375,317). SBN overtook Fort Wayne International in 2019 (397,938) to reclaim second place. The airport is in second place behind Indianapolis in cargo operations and third in the state for overall take-offs and landings. Due to South Bend's proximity to Chicago, South Bend air traffic controllers work closely with Chicago Center and Chicago Approach Control to sequence aircraft into and out of Chicago's terminal airspace. These efforts make South Bend's Tower/TRACON the second busiest terminal air traffic facility in the state and one of the busiest in the region.

In 2019 the airport handled 47,756 aircraft operations, averaging 130 per day. The TRACON handled over 150,000 operations in 2019.

Air service
South Bend's four airlines have non-stop flights to thirteen cities. Allegiant offers flights to Las Vegas, Orlando, Phoenix-Mesa, Punta Gorda, St Pete/Clearwater, Sarasota (seasonal); American Eagle has twice daily flights to Charlotte and Dallas; Delta Connection offers service to Atlanta, Detroit, and Minneapolis; and United Express has multiple daily flights to Chicago O'Hare.

With the exception of Allegiant's Airbus A319/A320s, South Bend mostly sees regional jets such as the Bombardier CRJ200/700 and the Embraer E145/175. During Notre Dame football games and graduation, Delta is known to upgrade to mainline aircraft such as the Airbus A319/A320, Boeing 717, and McDonnell Douglas MD80 aircraft. Additionally, Delta and United have added point to point football flights for fans to travel directly from one college town to the other.

According to the 2007 Economic Impact Report from the Aviation Authority of Indiana, the airport's annual economic impact on South Bend and surrounding communities was in excess of $433.7 million. SBN's annual contribution to the Indiana economy is estimated at more than $1.4 billion.

Ground transportation

Rail 
The South Shore Line commuter rail runs from South Bend Airport station to Millennium Station in downtown Chicago, with express services taking 1 hour and 55 minutes.

There is discussion of relocating the station either to a different side of the airport, or to the city's downtown.

Bus 
South Bend Transpo bus route 4 serves the airport.

Hoosier Ride (operated by Miller Transportation) provides intercity bus service at the airport. Greyhound Lines formerly provided intercity bus service at the airport, but, in December 2019, it moved its South Bend stop from the airport to South Street Station.

Airlines and destinations

Passenger

Cargo

Statistics

{| class="wikitable"
|+ Top 10 destinations(January 2022 – December 2022)'! Rank
! Airport
! Passengers
! Airlines
|-
| 1
|       Chicago–O'Hare, Illinois
| 68,980
| United 
|-
| 2
|       Atlanta, Georgia
| 47,770
| Delta
|-
| 3
|       Charlotte, North Carolina
| 46,420
| American
|-
| 4
|       Dallas–Fort Worth, Texas
| 42,710
| American 
|-
| 5
|       Punta Gorda/Fort Myers, Florida
| 24,130
| Allegiant
|-
| 6
|       Orlando–Sanford, Florida
| 21,490
| Allegiant
|-
| 7
|       Minneapolis, Minnesota
| 20,440
| Delta
|- 
| 8
|       St. Petersburg/Clearwater, Florida
| 18,210
| Allegiant
|- 
| 9
|       Phoenix/Mesa, Arizona 
| 17,770
| Allegiant 
|-
| 10
|       Detroit, Michigan
| 26,320
| Delta
|}

Incidents

 July 9, 1995: American Eagle Flight 4127, an ATR 72 operated by Simmons Airlines, experienced a loss of the rear cabin entry door during its climb after taking off from O'Hare International Airport in Chicago. The cabin door opened shortly after the first officer began to pressurize the cabin; therefore, only a slight pressure differential existed between the cabin pressure and the atmospheric pressure. Lack of damage indicates the door was unlocked/unlatched when it opened. The airplane was one of fifteen aircraft equipped with a new handrail and door handle design which was different than the majority of the ATR 72 fleet. The old handle was pulled down to latch/lock the door and pushed up to unlatch/unlock the door. The direction of motion was reversed so that the handle was pushed up to latch/lock the door and pulled down to unlatch/unlock the door. A private citizen located the separated door in approximately two feet of water in the Des Plaines River on July 10, 1995. Following this incident, ATR designed another new door handle design which returns the handle motion to push up to unlatch/unlock, and pull down to latch/lock.
 On April 4, 2011, a pilot flying from Chicago Executive Airport attempted to land a rented Cirrus SR22, but was hit by a gust of wind on approach. The plane landed on the left wing, cart-wheeled and came to a stop  from the runway. He was hospitalized in critical condition, with no one else on board. He later died from his injuries.
 On March 17, 2013, a private jet crashed into three homes near South Bend Regional Airport. Two of the four people on the plane were killed while the other two on board, and one person on the ground, were injured. 
 On September 12, 2017, a Beech N35 Bonanza made a forced landing into a ditch just short of the airport perimeter fence. No injuries were reported.

 On May 25, 2018, SkyWest (Delta Connection) Flight 4647 made an emergency landing in South Bend after a halon bottle exploded in the cargo bin. The aircraft had just departed South Bend bound for Atlanta. None of the passengers or crew on board were injured.

See also

Indiana World War II Army Airfields

Notes

References

 

External links
 South Bend Airport, official site
 Airline On-Time Reports compiled by the Federal Bureau of Transportation Statistics
 Former airport director John Schalliol honored with bronze plaque
 Aerial image as of April 1998 from USGS The National Map''
 
 

Airports in Indiana
Transportation in South Bend, Indiana
Buildings and structures in South Bend, Indiana
South Shore Line
Airfields of the United States Army Air Forces in Indiana
Airfields of the United States Army Air Forces Air Transport Command in North America
1933 establishments in Indiana
Airports established in 1933
Transportation buildings and structures in St. Joseph County, Indiana